The following are the national records in athletics in Gibraltar maintained by the Gibraltar Amateur Athletics Association (GAAA).

Outdoor

Key to tables:

+ = en route to longer distance

h = hand timing

a = automatic timing

Men

Women

Indoor

Men

Women

Notes

References
General
Gibraltarian Records  24 February 2019 updated
Specific

External links
 GAAA web site

See also

 Sport in Gibraltar

Gibraltar
records